Adrien-François Servais (6 June 180726 November 1866) was one of the most influential cellists of the nineteenth century. He was born and died in Halle, Belgium. He is one of the founders of the Modern Cellistic Schools of Paris and Madrid, which began with his friend Auguste Franchomme and his disciple Víctor Mirecki Larramat. His compositions are still being studied, performed and recorded all over the world.

Biography

Servais was originally trained as a violinist before switching to the cello. Known by his contemporaries for his virtuosity and excessive vibrato, he was given the gift of a Stradivarius cello from 1701, which today bears his name. He is also known as the first cellist to adopt the bassists' use of an endpin because of the large size of his Stradivarius. (The use of the endpin was, however, not generally adopted by most cellists until the early 20th century. For instance, Carlo Alfredo Piatti never used an endpin, though its use by Lisa Cristiani in the 1840s and 1850s did popularize it for female cellists.) He composed numerous works for his instrument, including four concerti and nearly twenty duos for two cellos or for cello and violin. Hector Berlioz later referred to Servais as "the Niccolò Paganini of the cello".

Some years after his death in 1866, Servais was honored by his home town of Halle, where a statue of him was placed on its central market square by his son-in-law, Professor Cyprian Godebski.

The South-West Brabant Museum in Halle has a collection on his life and work.

Works
Own Compositions
Fantaisie sur un thème favori, Op. 1 for cello and piano - also for cello and harp
Souvenir de Spa, fantaisie,  Op. 2 for cello and piano - also cello and quartet
Le Comte Ory. Caprice, Op. 3 for cello and piano - also for two cellos
Fantaisie et Variations brillantes sur la Valse de Schubert, Intitulée Le Désir, Op. 4 for cello and piano - also for cello and orchestra
Concerto (en Si mineur) Op. 5 for cello and piano - also for cello and orchestra
Le Barbier de Séville, Grande Fantaisie, Op. 6 for cello and piano - also for cello and quartet - also for cello and orchestra
Andante cantabile et Rondo à la Mazurka sur un Air de Balfe, Op. 7 for cello and piano - also for cello and orchestra
Fantaisie Characteristique sur deux célèbres Romances de Lafont, Op. 8 for cello and piano - also for cello and quartet - also for cello and orchestra
Fantaisie burlesque (ou le Carnaval de Venise), Op. 9 for cello and piano - also for cello and quartet - also for cello and orchestra
Souvenir de la Suisse. Caprice, Op. 10 for cello and piano - also for cello and quartet - also for cello and orchestra
6 Caprices pour Violoncelle, Op. 11 for 2 cellos
Grande fantaisie sur des motifs de l’opera Lestocq, Op. 12 for cello and piano - also for cello and quartet - also for cello and orchestra
Fantaisie sur 2 Airs russes, Op. 13 for cello and piano - also for cello and quartet
Morceau de Concert (deuxieme Concerto en Mi mineur), Op. 14 for cello and piano - also for cello and quartet - also for cello and orchestra
Souvenir de St. Petersburg. Fantaisie, Op. 15 for cello and piano - also for cello and orchestra
La Fille du Régiment. Fantaisie et Variations, Op. 16 for cello and piano - also for cello and quartet - also for cello and orchestra
O cara memoria: Fantaisie et Variations, Op. 17 for cello and piano - also for cello and orchestra
Concerto Militaire (en Ut mineur), Op. 18 for cello and piano - also for cello and orchestra
Grande Fantaisie polonaise sur des Airs du ballet ‘La Noce de Cracovie’, Op. 19 for cello and piano - also for cello and orchestraSouvenir de Bade. Grande Fantaisie, Op. 20 for cello and piano - also for cello and orchestraSouvenir de Czernowitz. Morceau de Salon sur des Airs Roumains, Op. 21 for cello and pianoConcerto (en La mineur) Op. posthumous for cello and piano - also for cello and orchestra
Servais & Joseph Ghys (cello & violin)Variations brillantes et concertantes sur l’air “God Save the King”Servais & Henri Vieuxtemps (cello & violin)Grand Duo sur des motifs de l’Opéra Les Huguenots de G. MeyerbeerServais & Hubert Léonard (cello & violin)Grand Duo de Concert sur deux airs nationaux anglais2me Grand duo de Concert sur des thèmes de Beethoven3me Duo de Concert4e Duo de Concert sur des motifs de l’opéra L’Africaine de MeyerbeerServais & Jacques Gregoir (cello & piano)
 
 
 
 
 
 
 
 
 
 
 
 
 
 
 
 
 
 
 
 
 
 
 
 
 
 
 
 
 

Transcriptions of works by other composersElégie en ut pour l'Alto, J. F. Mazas, op. 73La Romanesca, fameux air de danse de la fin du XVIme siècleLe Lac de Côme. Barcarolle composée par Mr. G. AlariSouvenirs élégiaques de A. BessemsRegrets, Pensée musicale à la mémoire de la Reine des Belges, par J. GrégoirLa Veillée, Pastorale de B. DamckeEtudes de Rhythme par L. J. Meerts. Transcrites pour deux Violoncelles6 Morceaux caractéristiques composés par H. Ferd. Kufferath, Op. 302 Mazurkas de Chopin [Mazurka in F sharp Minor Op. 6 No 1 en Mazurka in F Minor Op. 7 No 3]Nocturne de F. Chopin [Nocturne in E flat Major Op. 9 No 2]
Unpublished compositionsFantaisie intitulée concertinoFantaisie La RomantiqueSouvenir d’AnversFantasia sur la folleFantaisie éléganteFantaisie et Variations n° 18Fantaisie Caprice pour 2 VioloncellesFantaisie pour violoncelleMaître CorbeauFantaisie sur l’hymne national/Fantaisie belge pour violoncelleAir varié pour contrebasseDeux célèbres mélodies de GlinkaGrand Duo de Guillaume Tell (Servais & Jules Godefroid)Duo sur Lucie de Lammermoor (Servais & Félix Godefroid)
Not yet located compositionsLe Chant des AlpesGrande Fantaisie, Souvenir de NaplesFantaisie slaveCaprice ‘Hommage à Rossini’Souvenir de HaydnCinquième Concerto*Souvenir de KievVariations on the Russian Anthem themeSouvenirs du Mont-d'OrLarghetto - W. A. Mozart (arranged by Servais for cello, organ-harmonium and piano)Melodie for voice and cello (Servais & Willem Pasques de Chavonnes Vrugt  )Grand Duo de piano et violoncelle (with Jules Déjazet)
Note: The 4th Concerto, in A minor, Op. Posth. has been found and a performance of it is available on YouTube by cellist Seeli Toivio.

Bibliography
Lev Ginsburg, History of the Violoncello, Paganiniana Publications, 1983
Peter François, Adrien François Servais (1807–1866), The Paganini of the CelloPeter François, Ah! Le métier de donneur de concerts! Adrien François Servais (1807–1866) als rondreizend cellovirtuoos, Halle, Servais Society, 2007
Peter François, Adrien François Servais 1807-2007. Halse cellist met wereldfaam. Catalogus van de tentoonstelling in Halle, 5 mei - 6 juni 2007'', Halle, Servais Society, 2007 (illustrated exhibition catalogue)

References

External links

The Servais Society website 
Festival Servais 2007
www.cello.org
 
Introduction to Servais' works for cello and orchestra

1807 births
1866 deaths
19th-century classical composers
19th-century Belgian male musicians
Romantic composers
Belgian classical composers
Belgian male classical composers
Belgian music educators
Belgian classical cellists
People from Halle, Belgium
20th-century cellists